Inishnee is a small island off the shore of Ireland, in Roundstone Bay near the village of Roundstone in Connemara in County Galway. The island is equipped with a lighthouse. , it had a population of 43.

Demographics 
The table below shows data on Inishnee's population taken from Discover the Islands of Ireland (Alex Ritsema, Collins Press, 1999) and the Census of Ireland.

External links 
 Islands - Change in Population 1841 - 2006
 Location of Inishnee lighthouse

Other projects

Islands of County Galway
Gaeltacht places in County Galway